A list of men and women international rugby league matches played throughout 2020 and does not include wheelchair rugby league international matches. A † denotes a recognised, but unofficial match that did not contribute to the IRL World Rankings.

Many fixtures scheduled were cancelled or rescheduled due to the ongoing COVID-19 pandemic. The Kangaroo tour of England, Oceania Cup, and European Championship were all cancelled. The European Championship B, European Championship C, European Championship D and Americas Championship were all postponed until 2021, whilst the MEA Championship was postponed until a later date not confirmed.

As a result of the travel restrictions from COVID-19, only two respective men's and women's test matches were played in 2020; a men's international between Peru and Brazil in Sydney before the pandemic began, the Griffin Cup match between Germany and Netherlands, and a women's 'Clash of the Pacific' double-header in Auckland where Tonga and Niue, and New Zealand and Tonga played each other.

Season overview

Rankings

The following were the rankings at the beginning of the season.

February

Peru vs Brazil men in Australia

September

Germany men in Netherlands

November

Tonga vs Niue women in New Zealand

Samoa women in New Zealand

See also
 Impact of the COVID-19 pandemic on rugby league

References 

2020 in rugby league